Bolnhurst and Keysoe is a civil parish in Bedford, Bedfordshire, England. It contains 51 listed buildings that are recorded in the National Heritage List for England.  Of these, one is listed at Grade I, the highest of the three grades, one is listed at Grade II*, the middle grade and, the others are at Grade II, the lowest grade. The parish consists of the villages of Bolnhurst and Keysoe, along with the hamlet of Keysoe Row.

Key

Buildings

References

Lists of listed buildings in Bedfordshire
Listed buildings in the Borough of Bedford